Flight 51 may refer to:

Aeroflot Flight 51, crashed on 30 December 1967
United Nations Flight 51, crashed on 9 August 1974
ACE Air Cargo Flight 51, crashed on 8 March 2013
Siberian Light Aviation Flight 51, crashed on 12 September 2021

0051